A Civil Action is a 1998 American legal drama film written and directed by Steven Zaillian, based on the 1995 book of the same name by Jonathan Harr. Starring John Travolta, Robert Duvall, James Gandolfini, Dan Hedaya, John Lithgow, William H. Macy, Kathleen Quinlan, and Tony Shalhoub, it tells the true story of a court case about environmental pollution that took place in Woburn, Massachusetts in the 1980s. The film and court case revolve around the issue of trichloroethylene, an industrial solvent, and its contamination of a local aquifer. A lawsuit was filed over industrial operations that appeared to have caused fatal cases of leukemia and cancer, as well as a wide variety of other health problems, among the citizens of the city. The case involved is Anne Anderson, et al., v. Cryovac, Inc., et al.. The first reported decision in the case is at 96 F.R.D. 431 (denial of defendants' motion to dismiss). Duvall was nominated for the Academy Award for Best Supporting Actor for his performance.

Plot
Environmental toxicants in the city of Woburn, Massachusetts contaminate the area's water supply and become linked to a number of deaths of local children. Cocky Boston attorney Jan Schlichtmann and his small firm of personal injury lawyers are asked by Woburn resident Anne Anderson to take legal action against those responsible. After originally rejecting a seemingly unprofitable case, Jan finds a major environmental issue involving groundwater contamination that has great legal potential and realizes the local tanneries could be responsible for several deadly cases of leukemia. Jan decides to go forward against two giant corporations which own the tanneries—Beatrice Foods and W. R. Grace and Company—thinking that the case could possibly earn him millions and boost his firm's reputation.

Bringing a class action lawsuit in federal court, Jan represents families who demand an apology and a clean-up of contaminated areas. However, the case develops a life of its own and takes over the lives of Jan and his firm. The lawyers for Beatrice and Grace are not easy to intimidate, a judge makes a key ruling against the plaintiffs, and soon Jan and his partners find themselves in a position where their professional and financial survival has been staked on the outcome of the case. Jan stubbornly declines settlement offers, gradually coming to believe that the case is about more than just money. He allows his pride to take over, making outrageous demands and deciding that he must win at all costs. Pressures take their toll, with Jan and his partners going deeply into debt.

After a lengthy trial, the case is dismissed in favor of Beatrice, after Jan turned down an offer of $20 million from Beatrice attorney Jerry Facher during jury deliberations. The plaintiffs are forced to accept a settlement with Grace that barely covers the expense involved in trying the case, leaving Jan and his partners broke. The families are deeply disappointed, and Jan's partners dissolve their partnership, effectively breaking up the firm. Jan ends up alone, living in a small apartment and running a small-time law practice. He manages to find the last key witness to the case, but lacks resources and courage to appeal the judgement. The files are archived while Jan later files for bankruptcy.

A postscript reveals that the EPA, building on Jan's work on the case, later brought its own enforcement action against Beatrice and Grace, forcing them to pay millions to clean up the land and the groundwater. It takes Jan several years to settle his debts, and he now practices environmental law in New Jersey.

Cast

Kathy Bates appears in an uncredited cameo in the final scene as the judge overseeing Jan's bankruptcy hearing.

Filming

The movie was shot in Boston, Massachusetts; Dedham, Massachusetts; Jamaica Plain, Massachusetts; Waltham, Massachusetts; Northbridge, Massachusetts; Palmer, Massachusetts; Fenway Park; Boston Public Garden; and Beacon Hill, Boston.

Release

Box office
Despite showing promise on its initial limited release, A Civil Action was a box office failure on wide release, earning a domestic gross of $56 million against its $75 million budget. The film was released in competition with a number of films that became hits, earning between $120 and $290 million each, including Shakespeare in Love, The Prince of Egypt, Star Trek: Insurrection, You've Got Mail, Stepmom and Patch Adams.

Reception

On Rotten Tomatoes, A Civil Action has an approval rating of 62% based on reviews from 71 critics. The site's consensus called the film "Intelligent and unconventional." On Metacritic, the film has a score of 68 out of 100, based on reviews from 26 critics. Audiences surveyed by CinemaScore gave the film a grade B on scale of A to F.

Roger Ebert of the Chicago Sun-Times gave the film 3.5 out of 4 and wrote: "Civil Action is like John Grisham for grownups."

References

External links 

 
 
 
 
 
 A Civil Action: Before the book and before the film (early newspaper articles by reporter Charles C. Ryan)
 Beyond A Civil Action hosted by W. R. Grace & Co.
 In Toxic Tort Litigation, Truth Lies at the Bottom of a Bottomless Pit by Eric Asimow, Picturing Justice: The On-Line Journal of Law & Popular Culture, February 1999
 Anderson v. Beatrice Foods Index and copies of every pleading filed in the Woburn suit, maintained by Florida State University College of Law

1998 films
1990s American films
1990s English-language films
1998 drama films
1990s legal films
Films set in the 1980s
American legal drama films
American courtroom films
Drama films based on actual events
Environmental films
Films about lawyers
Films based on non-fiction books
Films set in Massachusetts
Films shot in Dedham, Massachusetts
Films scored by Danny Elfman
Films with screenplays by Steven Zaillian
Films produced by Scott Rudin
Films directed by Steven Zaillian
Touchstone Pictures films
Paramount Pictures films